Alexandria Jane Krystel Wailes (born December 26, 1975) is an American deaf actress, dancer, director, and educator. She utilizes the languages of English and American Sign Language and is known for her work with Deaf West Theatre. She is both an LA Ovation nominee and a Tony honoree recipient for her work in musical theatre.

Career

In 2018, Alexandria performed the National Anthem & "America the Beautiful" at Super Bowl LII in American Sign Language alongside singers Pink and Leslie Odom Jr.

Theatre

Deaf West Theatre, L.A.
 Judgment Day .... God
 Quid Pro Quo .... Lindsay

Other stage works
 Love Person.... ???, Divadlo Mixed Blood
 Mother Courage and Her Children .... Kattrin, Public Theater
 Nobody's Perfect .... American Sign Language master and co-choreographer, Kennedy Center and Nationwide Tour
 Sleeping Beauty .... Rose, Divadlo Kirka Douglase
 Children of a Lesser God .... Sarah, Keen Company
 The Necklace .... Mother Valentine, New York City
 Aurora Leign .... Young Aurora, Ensemble Studio Theatre
 Big River .... Joanna, captain ASL, ensemble, Broadway Theatre (Nationwide Tour)
 Big River .... Joanna, Broadway Theatre, New York City (Roundabout Theatre Revival)
 This Island Alone .... Anne Tilton, Vineyard Theatre
 Pippin .... Visigoth Arm, Center Theatre Group, Los Angeles

Filmography
 CODA - American Sign Language master
 Conviction - Leticia Diaz (episode 1x06 Madness)
 Law & Order: Criminal Intent - Malia Gallo (episode 6x18 Silencer)
 Don't Shoot the Messenger - Shawn
 Sign It! American Sign Language Made Easy - Various
 The Flash - Murmur II / Michelle Anbar (3 episodes)

Dance
 Neither You Nr. I (choreographer, dancer), Dancing Festival Chashama's Oasis

References

External links
 Official website
 
 Interview with Alexandria
 Sign It ASL Bio
 Alexandria Wailes listing in Internet Broadway Database

American stage actresses
American deaf actresses
Living people
1975 births
Actresses from Wilmington, Delaware
American deaf people
Deaf actresses
21st-century American women